Friedrich Wilhelm Ernst Paulus (23 September 1890 – 1 February 1957) was a German field marshal during World War II who is best known for commanding the 6th Army during the Battle of Stalingrad (August 1942 to February 1943). The battle ended in disaster for the Wehrmacht when Soviet forces encircled the Germans within the city, leading to the ultimate death or capture of most of 265,000 6th army personnel, their Axis allies and collaborators.

Paulus fought in World War I and saw action in France and the Balkans. He was considered a promising officer; by the time World War II broke out he had been promoted to major general. Paulus took part in the Poland and Low Countries campaigns, after which he was named deputy chief of the German Army General Staff. In that capacity, Paulus helped plan the invasion of the Soviet Union. 

In 1942, Paulus was given command of the 6th Army despite his lack of field experience. He led the drive to Stalingrad but was cut off and surrounded in the subsequent Soviet counter-offensive. Adolf Hitler prohibited attempts to break out or capitulate, and German defence was gradually worn down. Paulus surrendered in Stalingrad on 31 January 1943, the same day on which he was informed of his promotion to field marshal by Hitler. Hitler expected Paulus to commit suicide, repeating to his staff that there was no precedent of a German field marshal ever being captured alive.

While in Soviet captivity during the war, Paulus became a vocal critic of the Nazi regime and joined the Soviet-sponsored National Committee for a Free Germany. In 1953, Paulus moved to East Germany, where he worked in military history research. He lived out the rest of his life in Dresden.

Early life
Paulus was born in Guxhagen and grew up in Kassel, Hesse-Nassau, the son of a treasurer. He tried, unsuccessfully, to secure a cadetship in the Imperial German Navy and briefly studied law at Marburg University.

Many English-language sources and publications from the 1940s to the present day give Paulus' family name the prefix "von". For example: Mark Arnold-Forster's The World At War, companion volume to the documentary of the same name, Stein and Day, 1973, pp. 139–142; other examples are Allen and Muratoff's The Russian Campaigns of 1941–1943, published in 1944 and Peter Margaritis (2019). This is incorrect, as Paulus' family was never part of the nobility, and Antony Beevor refers to his "comparatively humble birth" (like Rommel's family; their "sole similarity").

World War I
After leaving university without a degree, he joined the 111th Infantry Regiment as an officer cadet in February 1910. On 4 July 1912 he married the Romanian Constance Elena Rosetti-Solescu, the sister of a colleague who served in the same regiment. When World War I began, Paulus' regiment was part of the thrust into France, and he saw action in the Vosges and around Arras in the autumn of 1914. After a leave of absence due to illness, he joined the Alpenkorps as a staff officer, serving in France, Romania and Serbia. By the end of the war, he was a captain.

Interwar period
After the Armistice, Paulus was a brigade adjutant with the Freikorps. He was chosen as one of only 4,000 officers to serve in the Reichswehr, the defensive army that the Treaty of Versailles had limited to 100,000 men. He was assigned to the 13th Infantry Regiment at Stuttgart as a company commander. He served in various staff positions for over a decade (1921–33). In 1920s, as part of the military cooperation between Weimar Republic and Soviet Union to escape Treaty of Versailles, Paulus presented guest lectures in Moscow, Soviet Union.

Later, Paulus briefly commanded a motorized battalion (1934–35) before being named chief of staff for Panzer headquarters in October 1935. This was a new formation under the direction of Oswald Lutz that directed the training and development of the Panzerwaffe, or tank forces of the German army.

World War II

In February 1938, Paulus was appointed Chef des Generalstabes to Gen. Heinz Guderian's new XVI Armeekorps (Motorisiert), which replaced Lutz's command. Guderian described him as "brilliantly clever, conscientious, hard working, original and talented" but had severe doubts about his decisiveness, toughness and lack of command experience. He remained in that post until May 1939, when he was promoted to major general and became chief of staff for the German Tenth Army, with which he saw service in Poland. The unit was renamed the Sixth Army and engaged in the spring offensives of 1940 through the Netherlands and Belgium. Paulus was promoted to lieutenant general in August 1940. The following month he was named deputy chief of the German General Staff (Oberquartiermeister I). In that role he helped draft the plans for the invasion of the Soviet Union, Operation Barbarossa.

Eastern Front and Stalingrad

In November 1941, after German Sixth Army's commander Field Marshal Walter von Reichenau—Paulus' patron—became commander of the entire Army Group South, Paulus, who had never commanded a larger unit than a battalion, was promoted to General der Panzertruppe and became commander of the Sixth Army. However, he only took over his new command on 20 January, six days after the sudden death of Reichenau, leaving him on his own and without the support of his more experienced sponsor.

Paulus led the drive on Stalingrad that summer. His troops fought Soviet forces defending Stalingrad for over three months in increasingly brutal urban warfare. In November 1942, when the Soviet Red Army launched a massive counter-offensive, code-named Operation Uranus, Paulus found himself surrounded by an entire Soviet Army Group. Paulus did not request to evacuate the city when the counter-offensive began.

Paulus followed Adolf Hitler's orders to hold his positions in Stalingrad under all circumstances, despite the fact that he was completely surrounded by strong Soviet forces. Operation Winter Storm, a relief effort by Army Group Don under Field Marshal Erich von Manstein, was launched in December. Following his orders, Paulus prepared to break out of Stalingrad. In the meantime, he kept his entire army in fixed defensive positions. Manstein told Paulus that the relief would need assistance from the Sixth Army, but the order to initiate the breakout never came. Paulus remained absolutely firm in obeying the orders he had been given. Manstein's forces were unable to reach Stalingrad on their own and their efforts were eventually halted due to Soviet offensives elsewhere on the front.

Kurt Zeitzler, the newly appointed chief of the Army General Staff, eventually got Hitler to allow Paulus to break out—provided he continue to hold Stalingrad, an impossible task.

For the next two months, Paulus and his men fought on. However, the lack of food and ammunition, equipment losses and the deteriorating physical condition of the German troops gradually wore down the German defense. With the new year, Hitler promoted Paulus to colonel general.

Regarding the resistance to capitulate, according to Adam, Paulus stated

Crisis
On 7 January 1943 General Konstantin Rokossovsky, commander of the Red Army on the Don front, called a cease-fire and offered Paulus' men generous surrender terms: normal rations, medical treatment for the ill and wounded, permission to retain their badges, decorations, uniforms and personal effects. As part of his communication, Rokossovsky advised Paulus that he was in an impossible situation. Paulus requested permission from Hitler to surrender. Even though it was obvious the Sixth Army was in an untenable position, the German Army High Command rejected Paulus' request, stating, "Capitulation out of the question. Every day that the army holds out longer helps the whole front and draws away the Russian divisions from it."

After a heavy Soviet offensive overran the last emergency airstrip in Stalingrad on 25 January, the Soviets again offered Paulus a chance to surrender. Paulus radioed Hitler once again for permission. Telling Hitler that collapse was "inevitable," Paulus stressed that his men were without ammunition or food, and he was no longer able to command them. He also said that 18,000 men were wounded and were in immediate need of medical attention. Once again, Hitler rejected Paulus' request out of hand, and ordered him to hold Stalingrad to the death. On 30 January, Paulus informed Hitler that his men were only hours from collapse. Hitler responded by showering a raft of field promotions by radio on Paulus' officers to build up their spirits and bolster their will to hold their ground. Most significantly, he promoted Paulus to field marshal. In deciding to promote him, Hitler noted that there was no known record of a Prussian or German field marshal ever having surrendered. The implication was clear: Paulus was to commit suicide. Hitler implied that if Paulus allowed himself to be taken alive, he would shame Germany's military history.

Capitulation
Paulus and his staff were captured on the morning of 31 January 1943. The events of that day were recorded by Colonel Wilhelm Adam, one of Paulus' aides and an adjutant in the XXIII Army Corps, in his personal diary:

On 2 February 1943 the remainder of the Sixth Army capitulated. Upon finding out about Paulus' "surrender", Hitler flew into a rage and vowed never to appoint another field marshal again. (In fact, he went on to appoint another seven field marshals during the last two years of the war.) Speaking about the surrender of Paulus, Hitler told his staff:

Paulus, a Roman Catholic, was opposed to suicide. During his captivity, according to General Max Pfeffer, Paulus said, "I have no intention of shooting myself for this Bohemian corporal." Another general told the NKVD (the public and secret police organisation of the Soviet Union) that Paulus had told him about his promotion to field marshal and said, "It looks like an invitation to commit suicide, but I will not do this favor for him." Paulus also forbade his soldiers from standing on top of their trenches in order to be shot by the enemy.

Shortly before surrendering, Paulus sent his wedding ring back to his wife on the last plane departing his position. He had not seen her since 1942 and would not see her again, as she died in 1949 while he was still in captivity.

After Stalingrad and postwar

At first, Paulus refused to collaborate with the Soviets. However, after the attempted assassination of Hitler on 20 July 1944, he became a vocal critic of the Nazi regime while in Soviet captivity, joining the Soviet-sponsored National Committee for a Free Germany appealing to Germans to surrender. He later acted as a witness for the prosecution at the Nuremberg Trials. He was allowed to move to the German Democratic Republic in 1953, two years before the repatriation of the remaining German POWs.

During the Nuremberg Trials, Paulus was asked about the Stalingrad prisoners by a journalist. He told the journalist to tell the wives and mothers that their husbands and sons were well. Of the 91,000 German prisoners taken at Stalingrad, half had died on the march to Siberian prison camps, and nearly as many died in captivity; only about 6,000 survived and returned home.

After his return to the German Democratic Republic in 1953, Paulus gave a press conference in Berlin on 2 July 1954 in the presence of Western journalists, titled "On the vital issues of our nation". In it, he paid respect to the memory of General Heinz Guderian, who had died a little over a month previously, and criticized the political leaderships of the German Empire and Nazi Germany for causing the defeats of the German Army in both world wars:

He also criticized United States foreign policy as aggressive and called for a reconciliation between the Germans and the French:

Finally, he supported former German Chancellor Heinrich Brüning's appeal for a betterment of relations between West Germany and the Eastern Bloc, agreed with Brüning's criticism of West German Chancellor Konrad Adenauer's overtly pro-American policy, and expressed his hope for a German reunification:

From 1953 to 1956, Paulus lived in Dresden, East Germany, where he worked as the civilian chief of the East German Military History Research Institute. In late 1956, he was diagnosed with amyotrophic lateral sclerosis and became progressively weaker. He died a few months later, in Dresden, on 1 February 1957, aged 66, exactly 14 years and one day after his surrender at Stalingrad. As part of his last will and testament, his body was transported to Baden-Baden, West Germany, to be buried at the Hauptfriedhof (main cemetery) next to his wife, who had died eight years earlier in 1949, not having seen her husband since his departure for the Eastern Front in the summer of 1942.

Awards and decorations

 Iron Cross of 1914, 1st and 2nd class
 Military Merit Order, 4th class with Swords (Bavaria)
 Knight's Cross Second Class of the Order of the Zähringer Lion with swords
 Military Merit Cross, 1st and 2nd class (Mecklenburg-Schwerin)
 Cross for Merit in War (Saxe-Meiningen)
 Military Merit Cross, 3rd class with War Decoration (Austria-Hungary)
 Clasp to the Iron Cross (1939)
 1st Class (21 September 1939)
 2nd Class (27 September 1939)
 Knight's Cross of the Iron Cross with Oak Leaves
 Knight's Cross on 26 August 1942 as General der Panzertruppe and Commander-in-chief of the 6. Armee
 178th Oak Leaves on 15 January 1943 as Generaloberst and Commander-in-chief of the 6. Armee
 Order of the Cross of Liberty, 1st class with Oak Leaves and Swords (Finland)
 Order of Michael the Brave, 1st class (Romania)
 Military Order of the Iron Trefoil, First Class with Oak Leaves, (Independent State of Croatia)
 The Honour Cross of the World War 1914/1918, with Swords

Notes

References

Citations

Bibliography

External links

 

1890 births
1957 deaths
20th-century Freikorps personnel
People from Bezirk Dresden
German Army World War II field marshals
German commanders at the Battle of Stalingrad
German male non-fiction writers
German military historians
German prisoners of war in World War II held by the Soviet Union
German Roman Catholics
National Committee for a Free Germany members
People from Hesse-Nassau
People from Schwalm-Eder-Kreis
Recipients of the clasp to the Iron Cross, 1st class
Recipients of the Knight's Cross of the Iron Cross with Oak Leaves
Recipients of the Military Merit Cross (Mecklenburg-Schwerin), 1st class
Recipients of the Order of Michael the Brave, 1st class
Recipients of the Order of the Cross of Liberty, 1st Class
Military personnel from Hesse